Mystery of the Crystal Skulls is a 2008 American documentary television film hosted by Lester Holt and starring Jaime Awe and Bill Homann. The film is about crystal skulls, hardstone carvings of human skulls whose alleged finders have claimed are pre-Columbian Mesoamerican artifacts.

References

External links
 

2008 television films
2008 films
2008 documentary films
Crystal skull
American documentary television films
Films shot in Belize
2000s American films